In Heat is the fourth album by The Romantics. It was released in 1983 on Nemperor Records. It was the Romantics' most commercially successful album, and featured the Romantics's biggest hit single: "Talking in Your Sleep", peaking at #3, and a second top 40 hit, "One in a Million", charted #37.

Track listing 
All songs written by the Romantics, except where noted.

Personnel
Musicians
 Coz Canler - lead guitar, backing vocals
 Wally Palmar - rhythm guitar, lead vocals, harmonica
 Mike Skill - bass, backing vocals, rhythm guitar
 Jimmy Marinos - drums, lead vocals, percussion
 Pete Solley - keyboards

Additional personnel
 Pete Solley - producer
 Hal Hansford - engineering and recording
 Peter Solley, Neil Kernon - mixing
 Jim Sessady - assistant engineer
 Mike Fuller - mastering
 Christopher Austopchuk - art direction
 Larry Williams - photography

Certifications
US - Gold 
Canada - Gold

References

External links
"In Heat" at discogs

1983 albums
The Romantics albums
Epic Records albums